Guilford Bevil Reed  (November 27, 1887 – February 21, 1955) was a Canadian medical researcher whose research involved diseases such as tuberculosis, gas gangrene, tetanus and rinderpest.

Born in Port George, Nova Scotia, he received a B.Sc. in 1912, M.A. in 1913 and Ph.D. in 1915 from Harvard University. From 1915 to 1954, he taught at Queen's University.

In 1932, he was elected a Fellow of the Royal Society of Canada and was its president from 1952 to 1953. In 1947, he was awarded the Royal Society of Canada's Flavelle Medal.

In 1942, he was made an Officer of the Order of the British Empire.

References
 Queen's University biography

1887 births
1955 deaths
Canadian medical researchers
Canadian people of British descent
Fellows of the Royal Society of Canada
People from Annapolis County, Nova Scotia
Canadian Officers of the Order of the British Empire
Academic staff of the Queen's University at Kingston
Harvard University alumni